Levan, also known by his Muslim name Shah-Qoli Khan (born c. 1653 – 30 May 1709) was a Georgian royal prince (batonishvili) and the fourth son of the king of Kartli Shahnawaz (Vakhtang V). He was a titular king of Kartli in 1709.

In 1675, Levan was confirmed as a janisin (regent) of Kartli during the absence of his reigning brother, George XI (Gurgin Khan), at the Persian military service in Afghanistan. Summoned to Isfahan in 1677, he had to accept Islam and take the name Shah-Quli Khan. Thereafter he was appointed as naib of Kerman, Iran, and, as a commander of Georgian auxiliary forces, he secured the eastern provinces of the Persian empire from the rebellious Baluchi tribesmen from 1698 to 1701. For a short time in 1703, he was again a janisin for his absent brother in Kartli. As a reward for his military service the shah Husayn made Levan, in 1703, a divanbeg (chief justice) of Persia, and his son, Khusrau Khan, darugha (i.e., prefect) of Isfahan.

During his governance in Kartli, he patronised Catholic missioners in the Caucasus. He also encouraged scholarly activities in Georgia, and helped his cousin, Sulkhan-Saba Orbeliani, to create a Georgian dictionary, which is still widely used in Georgia. Although officially a convert to Islam, Levan covertly remained Christian and composed the prayers to St John the Baptist, St Peter, St Paul and other Christian saints.

Family and children 

Levan was married twice. He married, in 1672, Tuta, daughter of Kaikhosro I Gurieli, Prince of Guria. She died on 11 October 1678. Their children were:
 Kaikhosro of Kartli (1 January 1674 – 27 September 1711), king of Kartli;
 Vakhtang VI of Kartli (15 September 1675 – 26 March 1737), king of Kartli;
 David (1676–1703);
 Domentius IV (1677–1741), Catholicos Patriarch of Georgia
 Princess Khvaramze (1678 – fl. 1710), wife of Prince Sadzverel Chijavadze (died 1708).

Levan married Tinatin (c. 1655 – 1708), daughter of the Georgian nobleman Giorgi Avalishvili, in 1680, after the death of Tuta. She had previously been married to Prince Iotam Palavankhosroshvili (of Baratashvili stock; fl. 1658–1709), with one son, Bezhan, whose daughter Ana-Khanum would marry King Teimuraz II of Kakheti as his second wife in 1746. Tinatin bore to Levan several children:

 Jesse of Kartli (1680–1727), king of Kartli;
 Svimon (1683–1740), regent of Kartli;
 Teimuraz (died 1710).
 ?Alexander (died 1711), a general in the Safavid service, otherwise considered to have been a son of Levan's brother Luarsab .

Levan also had several natural children by unknown concubines:

 Rostom (Rustam Khan; died 8 March 1722), general in the Safavid army;
 Toma (fl. 1688–1703);
 Constantine (died 1756), who married in 1725 the certain Khvaramze;
 Adarnase (Afanasy) (15 November 1707 – 31 March 1784), general in the Russian army;
 Princess Khoreshan (fl. 1724).

External links and references 
 History of Iranian-Georgian relations, an article by Keith Hitchins at Iranica.com
 Political history of Georgia 1658-1703, excerpt from David Marshall Lang, The Last years of the Georgian Monarchy, 1658–1832

House of Mukhrani
1653 births
1709 deaths
17th-century people from Georgia (country)
18th-century people from Georgia (country)
Iranian people of Georgian descent
Safavid governors of Kartli
Safavid generals
Government of Safavid Iran
Kings of Kartli
17th-century people of Safavid Iran
18th-century people of Safavid Iran